Janine Mireille Irons  is a British music educator, artist manager and producer, who in 1991 co-founded with her partner Gary Crosby the music education and professional development organisation Tomorrow's Warriors, of which she is Chief Executive. In 1997 she and Crosby also initiated the Dune Records label, which has a focus on Black British jazz musicians and musicians from Tomorrow's Warriors. She has also worked as a photographer and musician.

Biography
Born in Harrow, London, Irons studied classical piano "with a teacher who was rumoured to have worked with [André] Previn". As a young teenager, she sang in a funk band and at 16 was offered a contract as a vocalist; instead, however, she decided to pursue a career in The City. Finding this work "well-paid but boring", she enrolled on a photography course at the City and Guilds of London Institute. It was while covering a jazz performance as a freelance photographer that she met her future partner, bass player Gary Crosby, and after helping with his band she went on to manage artists, as well as becoming involved with recording and releasing records.

Irons and Crosby founded in 1991 the jazz music education and artist development organisation Tomorrow's Warriors, of which Irons is managing director/CEO, and in 1997 began Dune Records, which soon developed into an award-winning label, with Irons as managing director. She has recalled initially having to do "everything apart from play the music!  I did the photography, the liner notes, the artwork, the press/PR, the distribution… everything!  However, with our third release, Denys Baptiste's Be Where You Are (1999), we decided to engage professional designers to ease the pressures on me.  Again, this album received great critical acclaim and, to our utter amazement, was nominated for the Mercury Music Prize, the most prestigious music prize in the UK which looks for the best releases of British music regardless of genre." In addition to Baptiste, other notable acts associated with Dune include Nu Troop, J-Life, Jazz Jamaica, Soweto Kinch and Abram Wilson.

Irons was nominated for a European Federation of Black Women Business Owners award in 1999. In 2006, she completed the Clore Leadership Programme Short Course on Cultural Leadership and, also in that year, was appointed as a Member of the Order of the British Empire (MBE) in the Queen's Birthday Honours, for services to the Music Industry. She is also a Fellow of the Royal Society of Arts (FRSA).

Awards and recognition
Irons was an honoree on the Roll of Honour for the 2020 Music Week Women In Music Awards, held in association with AIM and UK Music.

On 23 November 2020, she was featured by Robert Elms as a "Listed Londoner" on his BBC Radio London programme.

References

External links
 The Independent Ear interview with Janine Irons by Willard Jenkins, "Black Empowerment: Dune Records" (part 1), Open Sky Jazz, 25 February 2008, "Black Empowerment: Dune Records Pt.2", 8 March 2008.
 "The Team", Tomorrow's Warriors website.
 Ellie O'Connor, "Inspirational Woman: Janine Irons MBE | Co-Founder & Chief Executive, Tomorrow's Warriors", We Are The City, 13 December 2019.
 "Janine Irons MBE, Co-founder and CEO of Charity, Tomorrow's Warriors", Honest Mum, 25 October 2020.

Living people
Members of the Order of the British Empire
People from Harrow, London
British music educators
Year of birth missing (living people)
Black British photographers
British music industry executives